Hawkins-Hartness House is a historic home located at Raleigh, Wake County, North Carolina.  It was built about 1880, and is a 2-story, Eastlake-style brick dwelling with a four-story tower and numerous two-story projections.  It features a one-story hip-roof Eastlake movement style front porch. The house has been converted from a residence to a state office building, housing the office of the Lieutenant Governor of North Carolina.

It was listed on the National Register of Historic Places in 1972.

References

External links

Houses on the National Register of Historic Places in North Carolina
Victorian architecture in North Carolina
Houses completed in 1880
Houses in Raleigh, North Carolina
National Register of Historic Places in Raleigh, North Carolina
Government buildings on the National Register of Historic Places in North Carolina
State lieutenant governors of the United States